The King pigeon is a breed of pigeon developed over many years of selective breeding primarily as a utility breed. Kings along with other varieties of domesticated pigeons are all descendants from the rock pigeon (Columba livia).

The breed is known for its large size and suitability for squab production.

Show Kings

The breed also has a variety bred for exhibition purposes at pigeon shows. It is called the Show King to distinguish it from the purely utility variety. The Show King is dual purpose and can be used for squab raising.

History
The King is a dual purpose breed that originated in the United States. They were developed during the 1890s by crossing four older varieties: the Duchess for grace; the Homer for alertness; the Maltese for compactness and style; and the Runt for body and size.

Roles with humans

Food
King pigeon meat is popular in cuisines of parts of China, North Africa, North America, and some European countries.

See also 
List of pigeon breeds

References

External links 

 American King Club - established 1915
www.Kingtauben.de - Internetportal for Show King Breeder
 King Pigeon at Pigeonpedia
 King pigeon at Beauty of Birds
 Carcass Characteristics, Physicochemical Properties, and Texture and Microstructure of the Meat and Internal Organs of Carrier and King Pigeons

Pigeon breeds
Pigeon breeds originating in the United States